Thomas Ricketts (1901–1967) was a Newfoundlander and recipient of the Victoria Cross.

Thomas Ricketts may also refer to:
Thomas S. Ricketts (born 1963), owner of the Chicago Cubs
Tom Ricketts (1853–1939), film actor and director
Tom Ricketts (American football) (born 1965), American football player
Tom Ricketts (politician), Fiji politician